Goddred Gylby (fl. 1561), was an English translator. A son of Anthony Gilby, he translated Cicero's Epistle to Quintus, London, 1561, and John Calvin's Admonition against Judicial Astrology (no date).

References

Attribution

Year of birth missing
Year of death missing
English translators
Latin–English translators
16th-century English writers
16th-century male writers